Black Swan is a 2010 independent psychological horror film directed by Darren Aronofsky. It premiered as the opening film for the 67th Venice International Film Festival. The film had a limited release in selected cities in North America on December 3 and took in a total of about $415,800 on its opening day. After Black Swans opening weekend it grossed over $1.4 million, averaging around $80,200 per theater, the second highest per location for the opening weekend of 2010. When Black Swan finished its worldwide theatrical run, it had achieved blockbuster status with ticket revenue amounting to more than $325 million. Critics appreciated the film, with review aggregator website Rotten Tomatoes reporting an approval rating of 88 percent and placed it among their lists for the year's best films.

Black Swan has received honors in categories ranging mostly from recognition of the film itself, to its cinematography, direction and editing, to the cast's performance, particularly Natalie Portman's portrayal of the film's protagonist, ballerina Nina Sayers. The film was submitted for consideration for the Best Film Golden Lion at Venice's International Film Festival, but lost to Sofia Coppola's Somewhere. Mila Kunis was later given the Emerging Performer award for her portrayal of Nina's rival Lily, at the same ceremony. Darren Arnonofsky also earned a nomination from the Directors Guild of America for Outstanding Achievement in Feature Film. He was also named Best Director by the San Diego Film Critics Society and San Francisco Film Critics Circle Awards. The Visual Effects Society and Cinema Audio Society Awards each gave the film a single nomination, while Amy Westcott won for her work on Black Swans contemporary costumes from the Costume Designers Guild.

Natalie Portman has won a majority of the critic awards given to actresses for a leading 2010 film role. Out of the four nominations received from the 68th Golden Globe Awards, its only win was Best Actress in a dramatic motion picture, for Portman. It also received five Academy Award nominations, which included Best Picture, Best Actress, Best Director, Best Cinematography and Best Film Editing, Of those, its sole win was for Best Actress. More recognition for the film came from the Screen Actors Guild at their 17th annual ceremony, awarding Portman in her respective field as well as nominating the entire cast. A kiss shared between Kunis and Portman in Black Swan was nominated at the viewer-voted MTV Movie Awards and Teen Choice Awards.

Black Swan swept the Austin Film Critics Association and Independent Spirit Awards, winning five and four awards respectively. The film also won three awards at both the New York Film Critics Awards and the Oklahoma Film Critics Awards, and received a record 12 Broadcast Film Critics Association nominations. At the latter, the film was nominated in vastly different categories, ranging from its production design, to costumes and makeup to music featured in it. Black Swan performed similarly at the 64th British Academy Film Awards, again with 12 nominations, and was also nominated in similar categories. Another organization to laud the film with the same number of nominations was the Alliance of Women Film Journalists. They recognized Black Swan in categories including Most Beautiful Film and its depiction of sexuality, but despite Aronofsky's feature winning Best Film, it was also nominated in their Movie You Wanted To Love But Just Couldn‘t category.

Awards and nominations

 Each year is linked to the article about the awards held that year.

See also 
 2010 in film

References 
General

 

Specific

External links
 

Lists of accolades by film
Darren Aronofsky